Milnathort is a small town in the parish of Orwell in the county of Kinross-shire, Scotland and since 1996, the local council area of Perth and Kinross. The smaller neighbour of nearby Kinross, Milnathort has a population of around 2,000 people. It is situated amidst countryside at the foot of the Ochil Hills, and near the north shore of Loch Leven. From 1977 it became more easily accessible due to the development of the M90 motorway. The name comes from the Gaelic maol coirthe meaning "bare hill of the standing stones".

Amenities

Milnathort's amenities are typical of a small Scottish town with a nine-hole golf course, a park, countryside bike path, primary school, a range of pubs, cafés and a shop selling ice cream. Milnathort Town Hall was completed in 1855.

Church
The main church in Milnathort was built as a Secessionist Church in the north of the town and known as the Orwell Church which was built as a chapel in 1741 by the Old Light Burghers and rebuilt in 1821. It amalgamated briefly with the Church of Scotland in 1839 before transferring to the Free Church of Scotland in 1843. The manse was erected by the Free church in 1850 to house Rev James Thornton (1791-1874). The most notable minister was Walter Chalmers Smith.

Schools
The only school is Milnathort Primary School. The high school is Loch Leven Community Campus, just outside the town.

Notable residents
John Calder, publisher
Prof David Hepburn FRSE, anatomist, President of the Anatomical Society 1916–1918.
Laura Muir, middle-distance runner
Lucinda Russell, 2017 Grand National winning horse trainer
Walter Chalmers Smith, Free Church minister and poet

References

External links

Milnathort Primary School

Villages in Perth and Kinross